The Tramway du Cap-Ferret, also known as the Petit train du Cap-Ferret, is a  narrow gauge railway on the Atlantic coast of France in the  department of Gironde. The tramway is situated on the Cap Ferret, a peninsular that which divides the Atlantic Ocean from Arcachon Bay, and links the shores of the bay with the beaches on the Atlantic coast.

The line first operated in 1879 and was originally pulled by a horse. Locomotives took over in 1925, but the service ceased in 1935. In 1952, the service was restarted in its current form. In 1989, the train was acquired by the commune of Lège-Cap-Ferret.

It operates every afternoon from April to September, with services running every 30 minutes or less, and with some morning services in the peak summer season. Ferries connect the Jetée de Bélisaire with the resort town of Arcachon on the other side of Arcachon Bay.

Trains are operated by open-sided coaches hauled by diesel locomotives, and the line is largely situated along the road side. At the beach terminus, remains of the Atlantic Wall can be seen.

References

Bibliography 
 Jean Desrentes,  Le petit train des dunes, Société Historique et Archéologique d’Arcachon et du Pays de Buch, n° 93, 3ème trimestre 1997, p. 58 à 70 (in French)
 Luc Dupuyoo, Jadis et naguère... les petits trains du Cap-Ferret, Confluence, Bordeaux, 2007,  (in French)

External links 
 
 Cap Ferret: Tramway - Steamers - Vedettes - Lighthouse
 Page on the tramway from the web site of the Mairie Lege Cap Ferret (in French)

600 mm gauge railways in France
Gironde
Cap Ferret, Tramway du
Cap Ferret, Tramway du
Transport in Nouvelle-Aquitaine